Split Personalities (first released as Splitting Images) is a sliding square puzzle game that involves piecing together the faces of famous personalities and politicians. The game was developed for the ZX Spectrum by Ernieware and published by Domark, who also ported the game to the Amstrad CPC, Commodore 64, and Commodore Plus/4. The game was later released in 1993 for the Game Boy under the name Splitz.

Gameplay
The game presents the player with a blank grid to play with. The player controls a flashing cursor which can be moved at will over the canvas. Puzzle pieces are brought into play by pressing the fire button on a dispenser in the top corner of the grid. Pieces can then be slid around the screen. When a piece is moved, it can only be stopped moving by the walls of the play area or by another puzzle piece. A miniature preview of the completed image acts as a guide for the player and also highlights the piece of the puzzle that the player is currently controlling.

There are a total of ten puzzles in the game. The personalities featured (in order of appearance) are: Ronald Reagan, Margaret Thatcher, Neil Kinnock, Clive Sinclair, Alan Sugar, Humphrey Bogart, Charles and Diana, Fergie and Andrew, Mick Jagger and Marilyn Monroe. An updated version of the Commodore 64 game was included with Commodore's 'Night Moves/Mindbenders' C64 bundle in 1990, with Reagan, Sinclair and Sugar replaced with Helmut Kohl, Nelson Mandela and Mikhail Gorbachev respectively.

In addition to the puzzle pieces, there are also special tiles which yield bonus points if combined correctly, which include tiles based on the personality of the puzzle, often with political or satirical themes. For example, on the Thatcher level, combining 'Dennis'  and gin and tonic will yield bonus points. Other tiles included time bombs which need to either be ejected from the playing field by sliding them towards one of the holes in the sides of the playing area or combined with a water tap tile.

Spitting Image
Domark were forced to rename the game following legal proceedings from satirical TV puppet show Spitting Image who claimed that the original title, Splitting Images, was too close to the name of their show. Domark would later produce an unrelated, officially licensed Spitting Image game.

Splitz
In 1993, Imagineer released a Game Boy version of the game called Splitz, known in Japan as Splitz: Nigaoe 15 Game. The game was only released in Europe and Japan, and never saw release in North America.

While the mechanics of the game stayed the same, the puzzles and bonus blocks were changed. Like the original game, there are ten stages, with the addition of three bonus stages, which occur after every three levels are completed. In the bonus stages, the player arranges the tiles in a more traditional way of a sliding puzzle. Some of the caricature puzzles include Abraham Lincoln, Albert Einstein, and Elvis Presley. However, Ronald Reagan and Marilyn Monroe were kept in the game, but moved to other levels.

External links

1986 video games
Amstrad CPC games
Commodore 16 and Plus/4 games
Commodore 64 games
Domark games
Video games scored by David Whittaker
ZX Spectrum games
Video games developed in the United Kingdom